Runcie is a surname. Notable people with the surname include:

 Constance Faunt Le Roy Runcie, American pianist and composer
 James Runcie (born 1959), English novelist and playwright
 Robert Runcie, English archbishop
 Rosalind Runcie, English pianist

English-language surnames